Vejle Fjord Bridge is a cantilever bridge that spans Vejle Fjord between Mølholm and Nørremarken near the town of Vejle in Denmark. The bridge is 1712 metres long, the longest span is 110 metres, and the maximum clearance to the sea is 40 metres. The bridge has 15 spans and carries the European route E45 (before 1992 European route E3) over the fjord.

Vejle Fjord Bridge was built to lead traffic past the town of Vejle, where traffic congestion had become a problem in the 1970s. The building started in 1975, and the bridge was opened on July 1, 1980. It cost 350 million kroner. The bridge now has more traffic than any other motorway bridge in Denmark (if not counting short viaducts near Copenhagen such as the Tåstrupvej viaduct)

References

External links

The Vejle Fjord Bridge - Highways-Denmark.com
Pictures of Vejle Fjord Bridge
Picture of and data about the bridge
Webcam on the bridge

http://home.no.net/lotsberg/data/danmark/bru.html
Pictures from Vejle municipality's web page:     

Bridges in Denmark
Cantilever bridges
Road bridges in Denmark
Bridges completed in 1980
1980 establishments in Denmark